Missinipe (Woodland Cree: Misi-nipiy or Mahttawi-sipiy), meaning "big water" or "difficult river", is a northern settlement in northern Saskatchewan located in Treaty 10 territory and along the western shore of Otter Lake.

Etymology 
There are two similar explanations for the name of the settlement. According to Bill Barry's Geographic Names of Saskatchewan, the name Missinipe comes from the word Misi-nipiy, which is the Woodland Cree name for the nearby Churchill River and means "big water". Tourism Saskatchewan confirms that the hamlet's etymological origins come from the Churchill River but states that the word is instead Mahttawi-sipiy, meaning "difficult river".

Demographics 

Access and nearby communities 
The community may be accessed by Highway 102 or by float plane.

Along Highway 102, the hamlet is located between Sucker River Indian Reserve 156C and Brabant Lake. The community of Grandmother's Bay, an extension of the Lac La Ronge First Nation, lies approximately 5 miles to the northeast, directly across Otter Lake.

Camping and recreation 

As a result of its status as a main access point to the Churchill River, Missinipe is home to a float plane service, a canoe outfitter, and fishing outfitters. While generally empty during winter, the community is home to a seasonally operated general store, tourist cabins and other accommodations in the summer months. Tourism brings in seasonal campers, birdwatchers, and fishers, among others.

There are provincial campgrounds 5 km north at Otter Rapids, 7 km north at the Devil Lake Provincial Recreation Site, and 1.5 km south of the hamlet. There is also a provincial campground within the community itself, as the hamlet is nearby Lac La Ronge Provincial Park.

See also 
 List of communities in Northern Saskatchewan
 List of communities in Saskatchewan

References 

Northern settlements in Saskatchewan
Northern hamlets in Saskatchewan
Division No. 18, Unorganized, Saskatchewan